Wilfredo Prieto (born 1978; Sancti Spíritus, Cuba), is a Cuban conceptual artist. 

He moved to Havana to pursue his art studies at The University of Arts of Cuba (ISA), graduating in 2002.

Overview
He has a university diploma as a painter but he has not painted anything for the last 10 years. He admires the conceptualist Marcel Duchamp but tries to distance himself from any traditional way of making art and also tries to stay free of any particular historical or cultural considerations that could obstruct his creativity. Havana is certainly a significant point of reference and a very important focus for him.

His medium keeps changing, it depends on the particular idea or the concept he is working on and he never gets attached to any way of working. Most of the time, the missing elements in Prieto's work are obvious.

In fact, in 2001, he did his most widely known work “Apolítico” with 30 flagpoles stripped of their familiar colours. This show has been shown in Ireland, Italy and France. In 2004, the more than 5,000 books that comprised his Biblioteca Blanca were utterly blank (White Library). This show went to the biennial exhibitions in Singapore and Venice, and will travel next to Austria. For the 2006 Havana Biennial, he contributed a rotting banana peel, a bar of soap and a daub of axle grease, which he placed in a neat little pile on a floor of the exhibition space. He tampers with the ordinary until it becomes unlikely but not entirely impossible.
In 2006, he also transformed a Canadian art museum into a dance club, with disco lights, dance-floor, and everything except the music (Mute). In 2007, in a Barcelona gallery he once laid a rug in the middle of the floor, then carefully combed the gallery space for all the little bits of dirt and dust he could find, which he then swept under the rug (Untitled/Red Carpet).

One of his most recent works is called "Walking the dog and eating shit", which was a number of public exhibitions he did in Lennon Park in Havana.

Prieto recently won the 2008 Cartier Award, which entitles him to a three-month residency in London. He plans to use the time there to install a project he calls Estanque (Pond), which consist in covering the top of 100 oil barrels with a layer of water and serving as a makeshift habitat for a living frog.

Prizes and grants 

 2013 Beca de Artes Plásticas Fundación Botín, Santander
 2011 Seleccionado para el Premio Internacional de Arte Diputació de Castelló
 2010 Seleccionado para Future Generation Art Prize 2010, Kiev, Ucrania
 2008 The Cartier Foundation Award, con residencia en Gasworks, Londres. 
Premio F, Buenos Aires Beca de Creación Norte 08, Zaragoza
 2007 Residencia en Le Grand Café, St Nazaire, Francia
 2006 Residencia John Simon Guggenheim Foundation, Nueva York
 2005 Kadist Art Foundation, Paris, residencia
 2001 Segundo Premio, Salón Provincial Oscar F. M., Sancti-Spíritus
 2000 Premio a la mejor curaduría 2000, Galería Habana, DUPP, La Habana. The 2000 UNESCO
Prize for the Promotion of the Arts, VII Bienal de la Habana, DUPP, La Habana
 1997 Asociación Hermanos Saíz, Sancti-Spíritus, beca Nubes Verdes

Collections 

Art Gallery of Ontario (AGO), Ontario, Canadá
CA2M, Comunidad de Madrid, Madrid, España
Centre Pompidou, París, Francia
CIFO, Miami, Estados Unidos
Colección Adrastus, Mexico D.F., México
Colección Patricia Phelps de Cisneros (CPPC), Nueva York, Estados Unidos
Col·lecció Cal Cego, Barcelona, España
Collection Museum of Old and New, Tasmania, Australia
Coppel Collection, Mexico D.F., México
Daros Latinamerica Collection, Zúrich, Suiza
Fonds régional d'art contemporain corse (FRAC Corse), Francia
Fundación/Colección Jumex, México D.F., México
Solomon R. Guggenheim Museum, Nueva York
MUDAM Collection, Luxembourg
Museo Nacional de Bellas Artes, La Habana
Museum of Old and New Art, Hobart, Tasmania
Peter Norton Family Collection, California
S.M.A.K., Gante, Bélgica
Verbund Collection, Viena

Articles and reviews 

Lazo, Direlia. Wilfredo Prieto en la mira. Art OnCuba No. 03, julio-septiembre, 2014, pp. 70–75
Wilfredo Prieto (Entrevista). Elephant. The Art and Visual Culture Magazine, número 19, verano 2014, pp. 154–155.
Lazo, Direlia. Wilfredo Prieto. Hangar Bicocca, ArtNexus, No. 89, 2013, pp. 94–95
Mosquera, Gerardo. A one liner philosopher, Art in America, septiembre 2012
Alessi, Chiara. Wilfredo Prie Balancing the curve, Art-Domus, Milán, agosto 2012
Bardier, Laura. Wilfredo Prieto and the Work of Art as a Direct Gesture, Literature and Arts of the Americas, Issue 82, Vol. 44, No.1, 2011, pp. 143–148
Guerrero, Inti. A question of choosing, Metropolis, Oct-Nov, 2011, pp. 47–53
Hernández, Erena. Ser y nada, Atlántica Revista de Arte y Pensamiento, Centro Atlántico de Arte Moderno, #48/49, pp. 228–235
Dalila López Arbolay, Parachute 125: La Havana, Les intuitions illogiques de Wilfredo Prieto, enero-marzo 2007
Anaïd Demir, Jardin des Tuileries, Journal des Arts, 28 de octubre de 2006
Barriendos, Joaquín, La ciudad latinoamericana como reflexión estética, Lars, Nº5, 2006
Barriendos, Joaquín, The IX Biennial of Havana, FlashArt, Nº248, mayo-junio 2006
Castillo, Hector Antón, Wilfredo Prieto, ArtNexus, Nº58 Vol.4, p. 130, 2005
Oliver, Conxita, El qüestionament de la cultura, AVUI, Nº9837, 10 de febrero, 2005
Peran, Marti, Wilfredo Prieto, Exit Express, Nº9, febrero, 2005
Porcel, Violant, Los libros deshabitados, LaVanguardia, Culturas, 26 de enero, 2005
Molina, Ángela, Biblioteques i camins que es bifurquen, El País, 20 de enero, 2005
Sueza, Paula, Curator, enero/marzo, 2005
D.Abreu, Andrés, Mucha abstracción, Diario Gramma, Año 8/Nº158, 6 de junio, 2004
Rattemayer, Christian, 8 Bienal de Habana, Artforum, vol.XLII, n°6, febrero 2004
Salgado, Gabriela, 8th Havana Biennial : The Bittersweet Taste of Utopia, FlashArt, Enero-Febrero, 2004, p. 47
Papararo, Jenifer y Demkiw, Jains, Two perspectives on two collaborations, C Magazine, Winter, 2004
Rodríguez Enríquez, Hilda Maria, Palo porque boga y palo porque no boga. Giros en la octava bienal, Artecubano, Dossier p. 16, Nº1, 2004
Herzberg, Julia, ArtNexus, Nº52, 2004, p. 86
Benítez Dueñas, Issa, extracto de ARCO 2004, ArtNexus, Nº53, p. 98
Marx, Gary, Havana, Chicago Tribune, 20 de noviembre, 2003
Gopnik, Blake, In Havana, an Air of Possibility, The Washington Post, 16 de noviembre de 2003
D.Abreu, Andrés, Tras lo fiel a su mensaje, Diario Gramma, Año 7/Nº307, 3 de noviembre, 2003
León Arévalo, Glenda, Intervenciones y performáticas epocales y abstraídas, Artecubano, Dossier p. 8, Nº2/3, 2003
Mosquera, Gerardo, Del arte latinoamericano al arte desde América Latina, Art Nexus Nº48, abril, 2003, p. 70
Antón Castillo, Héctor, El sediento sueña que bebe, La Jiribilla, abril 2003
Noceda, José Manuel, Un texto infinito, AtlAntica, Nº37, p. 10

Bibliography 
Wilfredo Prieto, Mousse Publishing, Milan, 2014
Antes que todo, CA2M Centro de Arte Dos de Mayo, Comunidad de Madrid, Móstoles, Madrid (2010)
Los Impolíticos, PANI Palazzo delle Arti Napoli Mondadori Electa, Nápoles, 2010
Marroquí, Javier. y Arlandis, David, Cosas que solo un artista puede hacer, MARCO (Museo de Arte Contemporánea de Vigo) y MEIAC (Museo Extremeño e Iberoamericano de Arte Contemporáneo), 2010
Gabriele Schor (ed.), Held Together with water- Kunst aus der Sammlung Verbund- Viena, 2007
Olivares, Rosa (ed.), 100 Artistas Latinoamericanos, Exit Publicaciones, Madrid, 2007
Medina, Cuauhtemoc. Neither In the Slime of the Earth Nor in the Purity of Heaven, Mute, McMaster Museum of Art, Hamilton, Canada, 2006
Lazo Rodríguez, Direlia. Interview with Wilfredo Prieto, Mute, MacMaster Museum of Art, Hamilton, 2006, pp. 7–9
Juncosa, Enrique, López, Sebastián y Valdés Figueroa, Eugenio, The Hours, Visual Arts of Contemporary Latin America, Irish Museum of Art, Daros-Latinamerica, Zürich, 2005
Tannenbaum, Judith y Morales, René, Island Nations: New Art From Cuba, the Dominican Republic, Puerto Rico and the Diaspora, Rhode Island College of Design Museum, Providence, Rhode Island, 2004
Hlavajova, Maria y Mosquera, Gerardo, Cordially Invited, BAK, basis voor actuele kunst, 2004
Who if not we should at least try to imagine the future of all this?, Thinking Forward, Amsterdam, 2004
Pera, Rosa, Doble seducción, INJUVE, Madrid, 2003
Mosquera, Gerardo y Francisco, Rene, Wilfredo Prieto, Centro Cultural Español, La Habana, 2002

References

 Interview of Wilfredo prieto on Havana-Cultura
 Rattemayer, Christian, 8 Bienal de Habana, Artforum, vol. XLII, n°6, febrero 2004
 Porcel, Violant, Los libros deshabitados, LaVanguardia, Culturas, 26 de enero, 2005
 Mosquera, Gerardo. A one liner philosopher, Art in America, septiembre 2012
 Díaz Guardiola, Javier. Wilfredo Prieto: <<Podría venderle el "vaso" a un euro a quien demuestre que su concepto es fallido>>, ABC, 6 de marzo, 2015
 Lazo, Direlia. Wilfredo Prieto en la mira. Art OnCuba No. 03, julio-septiembre, 2014, pp. 70–75

External links
NoguerasBlanchard
Kurimanzutto
Wilfredo Prieto
 www.noguerasblanchard.com
 http://www.friezefoundation.org/cartier/
 http://www.frieze.com/issue/article/wilfredo_prieto/
 http://www.singaporebiennale.org/2006/artist_desc.php?id=61
 http://universes-in-universe.de/car/habana/bien8/cabana/e-tour-01.htm
 http://universes-in-universe.org/eng/intartdata/artists/america/cub/prieto
 http://www.e-flux.com/shows/view/
 http://www.art2bank.com/patronage_and_investment/frieze-announces-new-winner-of.php
 http://www.madridabierto.com/es/curriculum/wilfredo-prieto.html
 http://www.theharte.com/wilfredo_prieto.htm

1978 births
Living people
Cuban painters
People from Sancti Spíritus
Cuban contemporary artists
Instituto Superior de Arte alumni